The Indiana State Warriors were a professional basketball team in the American Basketball Association. The team was originally known as the Porter County Punishers.

History
The Warriors are based in Portage, Indiana, playing home games at Portage YMCA.

The Punishers first competed in the ABA during the 2011–12 season, going 0–3. The team changed names before the 2012–13 season when they finished fourth in the Mid-Central Division. The Warriors were 18th in the ABA Power Rankings release on February 17, 2013.

After the 2012–13 season the team went on hiatus. The club returned for the 2015-16 ABA season.

Season-by-season record

References

External links
 Official team website
 Indiana State Warriors on USbasket

Defunct American Basketball Association (2000–present) teams
Basketball teams in Indiana
Portage, Indiana
Basketball teams established in 2011